The Good Husband, is a 2020 Nigerian drama film directed and produced by Dickson Iroegbu. The film stars Sam Dede and Monalisa Chinda in the lead roles whereas Francis Duru, Thelma Okoduwa-Ojiji, Paul Sambo and Bassey Ekpo Bassey made supportive roles. The film deals with the problems arise with marriages.

The film was shot in Federal Capital Territory, Abuja. The film made its premier on 13 November 2020. The film received mixed reviews from critics.

Cast
 Sam Dede
 Monalisa Chinda
 Francis Duru
 Thelma Okoduwa-Ojiji
 Paul Sambo
 Bassey Ekpo Bassey
 Eeefy Ike
 Shield Nwazuruahu

References 

2020 films
English-language Nigerian films
Nigerian drama films
2020s English-language films